And Then Came Bumbo... is a 1984 Soviet family film directed by Nadezhda Kosheverova.

Plot 
The film tells about a sick girl, Alexandra, who asks her father to get her a living elephant in order to regain interest in life and cure her.

Cast 
 Oleg Basilashvili
 Valeriy Zolotukhin
 Tatyana Pelttser
 Svetlana Nemolyaeva
 Zinoviy Gerdt
 Aleksandr Pankratov-Chyorny		
 Sergey Filippov
 Natasha Shinakova		
 Sergei Parshin
 Georgiy Shtil

References

External links 
 

1984 films
1980s Russian-language films
Soviet children's films
Films directed by Nadezhda Kosheverova